Serge-Alain Maguy (born 20 October 1970) is an Ivorian former footballer who played for Africa Sports, Atlético Madrid, ASEC, Satellite FC, CS Chênois, as well as the Ivorian national side.

References

External links

1970 births
Living people
Association football midfielders
Ivorian footballers
Ivory Coast international footballers
1992 King Fahd Cup players
1988 African Cup of Nations players
1990 African Cup of Nations players
1992 African Cup of Nations players
1994 African Cup of Nations players
Atlético Madrid footballers
La Liga players
Africa Sports d'Abidjan players
ASEC Mimosas players
Satellite FC players
CS Chênois players
Ivorian expatriate footballers
Expatriate footballers in Spain
Expatriate footballers in Saudi Arabia
Africa Cup of Nations-winning players
Expatriate footballers in Switzerland
Expatriate footballers in Guinea
Ivorian expatriate sportspeople in Spain
Ivorian expatriate sportspeople in Saudi Arabia
Ivorian expatriate sportspeople in Switzerland
Ivorian expatriate sportspeople in Guinea